The following people with the surname Yakin have articles:

Yakin brothers, both Swiss footballers of Turkish origin
Hakan Yakin (born 1977)
Murat Yakin (born 1974)
Abraham Yakin (1924–2020) Israeli painter
Boaz Yakin (born 1966) American screenwriter and film director
Hannah Yakin (born 1933) Israeli artist

Turkish-language surnames